Reuben and Rose Mattus were Polish-Jewish entrepreneurs who founded the Häagen-Dazs ice cream business in the United States.

Biography

Reuben Mattus
Reuben Mattus (December 25, 1912 – January 27, 1994) was born in Poland of Jewish parents. He arrived at the Port of New York on the SS Vestris with his widowed mother Lea on March 5, 1921, several months before Rose Vesel. He started in the ice cream business as a child of 10, joining his uncle who was in the Italian lemon-ice business in Brooklyn, helping his mother squeeze lemons for the ices. By the late 1920s, the family began making ice pops, and by 1929 chocolate-covered ice cream bars and sandwiches under the name Senator Frozen Products, selling them from a horse-drawn wagon in The Bronx.

Rose Mattus (née Vesel)
Rose Vesel Mattus (November 23, 1916 – November 28, 2006) was born in Manchester, United Kingdom as Rose Vesel to Jewish parents who had emigrated from Poland.

Reuben and Rose Mattus

Reuben and Rose met in Brownsville, Brooklyn, New York. After finishing high school, Rose went to work as a bookkeeper at the Senator plant in 1934, and the two married in 1936. The Senator Frozen Products company was profitable, but by the 1950s the large mass-producers of ice cream started a price war leading to their decision to make a heavy kind of high-end ice cream. Reuben consulted some books and started to make a new heavy kind of ice cream. In 1959, they decided to form a new ice cream company with a foreign-sounding name. The name chosen was the Danish-sounding 'Häagen-Dazs' as a tribute to Denmark's exemplary treatment of its Jews during the Second World War, adding an umlaut which does not exist in Danish, and even put a map of Denmark on the carton.

From its launch in 1961, the ice cream was made using cream and natural ingredients for the flavorings, in contrast with competing brands which used often artificial ingredients, starting with three simple flavors: vanilla, chocolate, and coffee. Their ice cream was high in butterfat and had less air, which, according to Rose Mattus' autobiography, was the result of a factory accident, when the air injection pump broke. Reuben developed the flavors and Rose marketed the product. Her first marketing ploy was to dress up elegantly – in keeping with the upmarket positioning of the brand – and give away free samples at local grocers. Another part of her strategy was to market the brand to university students, and she made certain that ice cream parlors near New York University in Greenwich Village carried Häagen-Dazs, as well as upscale restaurants. The brand, which grew only slowly through the 1960s, was at first distributed nationally by Greyhound Bus deliveries to college towns. In 1966, Häagen-Dazs launched its fourth flavor, strawberry, a flavor that took them 6 years to develop. By 1973, it was sold throughout the United States, and in 1976 the first Häagen-Dazs store was opened in Brooklyn by their daughter Doris.

The business was sold to the Pillsbury Company in 1983 for $70 million. The Mattuses were kept on as consultants after the sale until Pillsbury was bought by Grand Metropolitan and their contract was not renewed; Häagen-Dazs is now owned by General Mills. After this, they launched the Mattus Ice Cream Company in 1992, this time specializing in low-fat products, calling them Mattus' Lowfat Ice Cream, a premium line of low-fat ice cream. Mattus' Lowfat Ice Cream was named one of the "Ten Best Products of 1993" by Time Magazine.

Personal life
The Mattuses lived in Cresskill, New Jersey. They had two daughters, Doris Hurley and Natalie Salmore, and five grandchildren.

In 1982, Reuben and Rose Mattus received the Golden Plate Award of the American Academy of Achievement.

Activism
Rose Mattus sat on the board of the Zionist Organization of America. The couple was known for their support of Rabbi Meir Kahane, founder of the Jewish Defense League and the Kach party. They were known for their support of Israel, founding a school of high technology in Herzliya which bears their name, and supporting the Israeli settlements.

Death
Reuben Mattus died on January 30, 1994, after suffering a heart attack. Rose Mattus died in Westwood, New Jersey on November 28, 2006.

References

Further reading
 

Business duos
American food company founders
American people of Polish-Jewish descent
British Ashkenazi Jews
People from Cresskill, New Jersey
20th-century American businesspeople
Polish businesspeople
Polish Ashkenazi Jews